Sod Solutions, a sod company founded in 1994, develops, conducts research on, and markets patented and trademarked grasses.

The company markets various sod brands like Celebration, and Discovery.

Turfgrass for sports fields

On May 30, 2012, a partnership was announced between 21 Florida sod producers from the Florida Sod Growers Cooperative and University of Florida turfgrass researchers. To find new and improved zoysiagrass varieties. Testing will evaluate varieties for their resistance to disease, response to drought and shade, their ability to retain color in cooler weather, and their resistance to pests such as billbug, armyworm and sod webworm. The program expects to have new grasses ready by 2017.

Sod Solutions is coordinating this partnership and will license and market those new grasses.

See also 

 Sod
 Lawn

References

Construction
Lawn care
Landscape architecture
Companies based in South Carolina